The Rowan-Virtua School of Osteopathic Medicine (also known as Rowan-Virtua SOM or SOM) is a public medical school located in Stratford, in the U.S. state of New Jersey. Founded in 1976, Rowan-Virtua SOM is one of two medical schools associated with Rowan University. Rowan-Virtua SOM confers the Doctor of Osteopathic Medicine degree (DO), and is one of the top medical schools for geriatric care and primary care as ranked by the U.S. News & World Report.

Rowan-Virtua SOM is accredited by the American Osteopathic Association's Commission on Osteopathic College Accreditation. The World Directory of Medical Schools lists the school as a US medical school along with other accredited US MD and DO programs.

History
The school was established under the University of Medicine and Dentistry of New Jersey in 1976 by the New Jersey state legislature. Initial classes were held at what is now Robert Wood Johnson Medical School for its first two years until its campus was complete. The first class of 24 students began on September 7, 1977.

Rowan-Virtua SOM's first affiliate was Kennedy University Hospital, which remains its principal teaching hospital. The Kennedy Health System includes hospitals in Stratford (adjacent to the SOM campus), Cherry Hill, and Washington Township. Other affiliates include Virtua Our Lady of Lourdes Hospital in Camden, Lourdes Medical Center in Willingboro, Christ Hospital in Jersey City, and Inspira Medical Centers in Elmer and Vineland.

The SOM Specialty Care Center opened in 1987; two years later, the adjoining Primary Care Center was purchased. The following year, the Science Center was built, and began functioning as the primary campus for the 4-year medical program.  The campus was completed in 1993 with the addition of the new Academic Center.

On June 28, 2012 the New Jersey state legislature passed the New Jersey Medical and Health Sciences Education Restructuring Act which dissolved the University of Medicine and Dentistry of New Jersey on July 1, 2013, resulting in the merger of the Stratford SOM campus with Rowan University and the remainder of its teaching schools associating with Rutgers University. University Hospital became an independent entity.

The school is accredited by the American Osteopathic Association's Commission on Osteopathic College Accreditation (COCA) and by the Commission on Higher Education of the Middle States Association of Colleges and Schools.

Academics
The school has a close affiliation with the six-hundred–bed Jefferson Health Stratford hospital (through their acquisition of Kennedy Health System in 2017) and Virtua Our Lady of Lourdes Hospital, a 437-bed tertiary hospital in Camden, New Jersey.

Notable alumni
Jane Aronson (born 1951), physician, with expertise in pediatric infectious diseases and adoption medicine.

References

External links

Osteopathic medical schools in the United States
Medical schools in New Jersey
Osteopathic Medicine
Educational institutions established in 1976
1976 establishments in New Jersey